Tatyana Maximovna Karakashyants (née Vereina; , December 21, 1925 – October 13, 2004) was a Soviet diver and diving coach. She competed in the 10 m platform at the 1952 and 1956 Summer Olympics and finished in sixth and fifth place, respectively. She won this event at the 1954 European Aquatics Championships. She was born in Kursk and died in Moscow.

References

1925 births
2004 deaths
Olympic divers of the Soviet Union
Divers at the 1952 Summer Olympics
Divers at the 1956 Summer Olympics
Soviet female divers
Soviet diving coaches
Honoured Masters of Sport of the USSR
Merited Coaches of the Soviet Union